Parasterinopsis is a genus of fungi in the Asterinaceae family. The relationship of this taxon to other taxa within the class is unknown (incertae sedis), and it has not yet been placed with certainty into any order.

Species
As accepted by Species Fungorum;
 Parasterinopsis caesalpiniae 
 Parasterinopsis orchidacearum 
 Parasterinopsis sersalisiae

References

External links
Index Fungorum

Asterinaceae